Vambori or Wambori (Marathi: वांबोरी) is a Panchyat town located in Rahuri Tehsil and, fall under Ahmadnagar district, Maharashtra State, India.

Vambori village falls under Rahuri assembly constituency, and Ahmednagar Lok Sabha constituency.

Location and transportation 
It is situated 19 km away from its sub-district Rahuri, 14 km Away From (M.P.K.V) Mahatma Phule Krishi Vidyapeeth and 25 km away from district Ahmednagar.

MSRTC buses are primary mode of transportation.

Geographical area 
The Total Geographical land area of Vambori is About 5425.97 hectares.

Demographics 
According to the 2011 Indian census, Vambori has a population of 19213 of which 9977 are males while 9236 are females as per Population Census 2011.

Vambori village slightly higher literacy rate compared to Maharashtra. literacy rate of Vambori village at 82.52% compared to 82.34% of Maharashtra.

Local administration 
The local administration of the village is handled by the Gram Panchayat, Vambori.

Local hospital 
The village of Wambori has a Government Rural Medical Hospital and a Government Veterinary Hospital.

Places of interest 
• Shree Khole shwar Mahadev Mandir. (Marathi : श्री खोलेश्वर महादेव मंदिर)

• Sri Pillay Swara Mahadev Temple ( Marathi : श्री पिलेश्वर (पंचमुखी) महादेव मंदिर ( Under the Dense Forest of Vambori Town Above the Hill this Five - Faced Lord Shiv Temple is Placed)

• Valmiki Tirth. ( Marathi : श्री क्षेत्र वाल्मीकि तीर्थ - This is the Ancient Pious Place where Rishi Valmiki visited and stayed here)

• Gorakhnath Temple ( Marathi : श्री चैतन्य गोरक्षनाथ मंदिर)

In Above Garbha Giri Hill Here is the Samadhi place of the main and second Guru of the Navnath sect, Shri Guru Gorakhnath.

• Shri Krishna Mahanubhava Panth Temple and Ashram ( Marathi : श्रीकृष्ण महानुभव पंथ मंदिर आणि आश्रम)

Shri Chakradhar Swami, the founder of the Mahanubhava sect had visited this village.

• Old Gram Devta Jagdamba And Dev Khandoba Temple.

• Malaganga Temple.

Local schools 
• Mahesh Munot Secondary and Higher College.

• Kanya secondary and higher College.

• Zilla Parishad Boys School. (Government Aided)

• Zilla Parishad Girls School. (Government Aided)

Notable people 
• Adv. Subhash Dattatraya Patil. ( Marathi : अँड. सुभाष दत्तात्रय पाटील) Former, Head of Village (Sarpanch) and former Zilla Parishad Member, Ahmednagar.

References

External links 
 Vambori

List of villages in Rahuri taluka

Villages in Ahmednagar district